Guy Charles Picciotto (born September 17, 1965) is an American singer, songwriter, guitarist, musician, and producer from Washington, DC.

He is best known as the guitarist and vocalist in Fugazi and Rites of Spring.

Career

Rites of Spring and early projects

Picciotto's career as a guitarist and vocalist began in 1984, with the group Rites of Spring. A part of the D.C. post-hardcore scene, Rites of Spring increased the frenetic violence and visceral passion of hardcore while simultaneously experimenting with its compositional rules. Picciotto, as the band's lyricist, as well as singer and guitarist, shifted hardcore into intensely personal realms and, in doing so, is generally credited with creating emo.

Picciotto's early musical resume includes the bands Insurrection (1982) where he only played guitar, One Last Wish (1986), Happy Go Licky (1987–1988), Brief Weeds (EPs released circa 1991–1992), and The Black Light Panthers (ongoing sporadic project since 1982), the last two bands both being projects with Brendan Canty. He created a record label called Peterbilt Records, which released limited-quantity vinyl record albums for the bands Rain, Happy Go Licky, and Deadline, then years later was involved in releasing the album 1986 by One Last Wish, along with Dischord Records.

Fugazi

Though not in the original lineup of Fugazi, Picciotto joined very early in the group's career, singing with them by their second show and appearing on all the band's studio recordings.

From the Repeater album on, he took up second guitar duties, playing characteristically trebly Rickenbacker guitars. After seven albums and several tours, Fugazi went on "indefinite hiatus" in 2003.

Side projects and production work
Picciotto has collaborated and performed with Mats Gustafsson, Vic Chesnutt, and members of the Ex among others. He has produced numerous albums including the Gossip's breakthrough record Standing in the Way of Control as well as Blonde Redhead's Melody of Certain Damaged Lemons (2000) and Misery Is a Butterfly (2004), The Blood Brothers final album, Young Machetes, and Downtown Boys' Cost of Living (2017) as well as two records for The Casual Dots, their self-titled debut album and the follow-up Sanguine Truth 2022. Additionally, Picciotto has produced four albums by the duo Xylouris White: Goats (2014), Black Peak (2016), Mother (2018), and The Sisypheans (2019)

Picciotto played on the Vic Chesnutt albums North Star Deserter (2007) and At the Cut (2009), and accompanied him on tours of Europe and North America. He co-produced the films Chain and Museum Hours with Jem Cohen (who made the Fugazi film Instrument).

In 2012, Picciotto was interviewed on stage at the Pop Montreal festival by Howard Bilerman about his experiences in the music industry. On January 24, 2020, Guy appeared on an episode of Live From the Barrage for a wide-ranging discussion that was his first long form interview in quite some time.

Equipment

Guitars 
 Rickenbacker 330 – Picciotto's main guitars are a sunburst Rickenbacker 330 and 2 identical black Rickenbacker 330's all equipped with RIC HB1 humbuckers. He has occasionally been seen playing a natural-finish 330. The characteristically trebly Rickenbackers allowed Picciotto to make use of sonic space not taken by MacKaye's chunkier, rhythmic guitar playing in Fugazi.
 Rickenbacker 370 – Picciotto's main guitar when he fronted Rites of Spring, One Last Wish and in the first few years with Fugazi was a Mapleglo Rickenbacker 370. It eventually ended up in a state too fragile for live use, but he still used it in the studio right up to The Argument.
Gibson Les Paul Jr. – During Picciotto's time with Rites of Spring and during the early days of Fugazi (photos show until at least as late as 1993), he could also be seen playing a white Gibson Les Paul Doublecut Jr. with a single P90 pickup. In an  interview done in 2011, Picciotto is quoted as having had a Gibson SG Jr. stolen in New York City. The NPR article may be incorrect about it being an SG and it was likely the same Les Paul Jr. guitar.

Amplification 
Park 100 Watt heads
Marshall JCM 800 2203 heads
Red or Black Marshall JCM 800 4x12 cabinets fitted with 75-watt celestion speakers
 Fender Twin reverb (studio)

Personal life
Picciotto was born to an American mother and an Italian father. He holds a BA degree in English from Georgetown University and is a graduate of the Washington, D.C. private school, the Georgetown Day School.

Picciotto married musician Kathi Wilcox from the band Bikini Kill and the Frumpies; as of September 2020 the two were living in Brooklyn with their teenage son.

Discography

Rites of Spring
Rites of Spring (1985)
All Through a Life (1987)
End on End (complete discography) (1991)

One Last Wish
1986 (1999)

Happy Go Licky
12" (1988)
Will Play (1997)

Black Light Panthers
Peterbilt 12" 82-97 (1997)

Brief Weeds
A Very Generous Portrait 7" (1990)
Songs of Innocence and Experience 7" (1992)

Fugazi

13 Songs (September 1989)
Repeater (March 1990)
Steady Diet of Nothing (August 1991)
In on the Kill Taker (May 1993)
Red Medicine (June 1995)
End Hits (April 1998)
Instrument Soundtrack (1999)
The Argument (October 2001)

References

External links
Interview from 2001 at Welcome to Flavor Country
January 1998 interview with Picciotto in Diskant
Nude as the News interview with Guy Picciotto (October 2001)
Pitchfork interview with Picciotto
Picciotto interview on the Morphizm site
Exclaim.ca September 2007 interview with Guy Picciotto
Picciotto's 1999 Fugazi Guitar Rig. GuitarGeek.com

1965 births
American punk rock guitarists
American people of Italian descent
American punk rock singers
Post-hardcore musicians
Georgetown College (Georgetown University) alumni
Living people
American indie rock musicians
American male guitarists
Fugazi members
20th-century American guitarists
Rites of Spring members
One Last Wish members
20th-century American male singers
20th-century American singers
Georgetown Day School alumni